Bógzapłać  is a part of the village of Sarnowo in the administrative district of Gmina Skępe, within Lipno County, Kuyavian-Pomeranian Voivodeship, in north-central Poland.

In the late 19th century, the settlement had a population of 34.

References

Populated lakeshore places in Poland
Villages in Lipno County